The Yanzhou campaign, also known as the campaign at the central section of the Tianjin-Pukou Railway, was a series of battles fought between the nationalists and the communists for the control of the town Yanzhou (兖州), which is today under the administration of Jining, and the region to the north of the town in Shandong, China during the Chinese Civil War in the post World War II era, and resulted in communist victory.

Prelude
By the summer of 1948, military setbacks had forced the nationalist army in Shandong into the defensive. The nationalists withdrew into major cities such as Jinan and Qingdao while stationing some forces along the Tianjin-Pukou Railway to secure the communication / transportation line.  The communists decided to deploy their units in Shandong to annihilate the enemy gradually in the region from Tai'an in the north to Xue City in the south. This would lead to encircling Xuzhou by linking up with the communist forces in southwestern Shandong.  The success of this campaign would assist another communist summer offensive, the Eastern Henan Campaign.  To carry out the plan, the local communists in Shandong decided to first take Tai'an and the surrounding regions in the north and south, thus cutting off the link between Yanzhou and Jinan, and then take the isolated Yanzhou and ambush any nationalist reinforcement sent for the town.

Order of battle
Defenders: nationalist order of battle:
The 10th Pacification Zone Command
The Reorganized 12th Army
The Reorganized 12th Division
The 2nd Division
The Reorganized 25th Division
The Reorganized 84th Division
Numerous local security divisions

Attackers: communist order of battle:
The 7th Column
The 9th Column
The 13th Column
Units from the Central Shandong Military District
Units from the Southern Shandong Military District

First stage
On May 29, 1948, the communist Shandong Corps launched its campaign against nationalist targets along the central section of the Tianjin-Pukou Railway, and forced the nationalist 155th Brigade of the Reorganized 84th Division guarding Tai'an to abandon the city and retreated northward.  The communist forces were able to expand their victory from Tai'an northward and southward, and by June 20, 1948, other cities and towns including Dawenkou, Qufu (east of Yanzhou), and Zoucheng (south of Yanzhou) had fallen into their hands.  Meanwhile, Yanzhou was besieged by the communist 7th Column. By June 25, 1948, the nationalist stronghold outside the town, Four Pass had fallen into enemy hands.

In order to reinforce Yanzhou, the nationalist Reorganized 25th Division stationed in northern Jiangsu was sent from Xuzhou along the Tianjin-Pukou Railway, and its advanced guard had reached the region of Jie River north of Tengzhou by June 28, 1948.  The communists decided to ambush the nationalist reinforcement by deploying the 9th Column and the 13th Column, while the communist 7th Column was ordered to stop its assault on Yanzhou (兖州) and redeployed to assist the 9th and the 13th Columns. As the communists laid their trap, the nationalists changed their priority.  The nationalist forces in Sui (睢) County and Qi (杞) County in eastern Henan, under the command of the corps commander Qu Shounian (区寿年), were besieged by the enemy and the situation was far more desperate than Yanzhou, so the nationalist Reorganized 25th Division was redeployed to Shangqiu by rail to reinforce the battlefield in eastern Henan, and thus inadvertently avoided the ambush set up for them.

The nationalist redeployment had left a strategically important town, Yanzhou, dangerously undermanned: the nationalist garrison of the town only had the Reorganized 12th Army and security divisions totaling 28,000 troops. The nationalists were betting on several factors that favored the defenders securing the city: As an important junction of the Tianjin-Pukou Railway, nationalist reinforcement from other places could readily reach the town via railroad.  Being located on the western bank of the Si (泗) River, the area surrounding the town was wide open with little cover for would-be attackers. Furthermore, there were semi-permanent fortifications both inside and outside the town. The battle and the consequent fall of the town into the enemy hands proved that these advantages could not be counted on. The communists decided to attack Yanzhou (兖州) again by concentrating a total of fifteen brigades from the Shandong Corps and local units to take the town and annihilate nationalist reinforcement. The communist 7th Column, 13th Column and units from Central Shandong Military District were tasked to attack the town, while the communist 9th Column was deployed to the north of Yanzhou, and communist units from southern Shandong Military District were deployed to the south of Yanzhou to ambush nationalist reinforcements.  The communist Bohai Column was deployed to the east of Jinan to prevent nationalists stationed in the city from reinforcing Yanzhou.

Second stage
On July 1, 1948, the communist Shandong Corps besieged Yanzhou again. The communist 7th Column and the bulk of the communist 13th Column were tasked with the major responsibility for attacking eastward from the west, with emphasis on the Old Western Gate and the New Western Gate. The communist units of the Central Shandong Military District and a portion of the communist 13th Column were deployed to the northeast and east of the town to assist the main attacking force.  At 5:00 p.m. on July 12, 1948, the assault on the city began. The intense fire destroyed the city wall along the Old and New Western Gates sections, and associated defensive positions. Under the cover of the shelling of mountain guns, the attacking infantry breached the defense and penetrated into the city at 8:30 p.m.  After a failed attempt to breakout to the east, the nationalist garrison was completely annihilated, with the nationalist commander-in-chief of the region and the commander of the Reorganized 12th Army, Huo Shouyi (霍守义), captured alive. The town was declared secured by the communist forces at 6:00 p.m. on July 13, 1948, after the mop up operation was completed.

As Yanzhou was besieged once again, the nationalist Reorganized 84th Division and the 2nd Division went out to reinforce their comrades-in-arms, but due to the fear of being ambushed, their progress was extremely slow.  When the advanced guard of the nationalist reinforcement had cross the Wen (汶) River and reached the town of Taiping on July 13, 1948, the news of the fall of Yanzhou had reached the nationalists, who immediately withdrew northward.  However, the retreating nationalists were caught up by the pursuing communist forces and the nationalist Reorganized 84th Division was badly mauled by the communist 9th Column, losing over 10,000 troops, including most of its 161st Brigade. This last battle concluded the campaign.

Outcome
The nationalists suffered more than 63,000 casualties in their defeat, and a dozen cities / towns including Qufu, Jining, Tai'an, Zou (邹) County, and Yanzhou had fallen into the enemy hands.  The nationalist garrison in Jinan was further isolated and the enemy succeeded in combining the previously separated communist bases in central and southern Shandong and western Shandong into a new one of much greater size.  The fall of the strategically important railroad junction Yanzhou also meant that both Xuzhou in the south and Jinan in the north controlled by the nationalists were threatened by the enemy, and communist victory also helped their Eastern Henan Campaign by tying down the nationalists forces in Shandong.

See also
List of battles of the Chinese Civil War
National Revolutionary Army
People's Liberation Army
History of the People's Liberation Army

References
Zhu, Zongzhen and Wang, Chaoguang, Liberation War History, 1st Edition, Social Scientific Literary Publishing House in Beijing, 2000,  (set)
Zhang, Ping, History of the Liberation War, 1st Edition, Chinese Youth Publishing House in Beijing, 1987,  (pbk.)
Jie, Lifu, Records of the Liberation War: The Decisive Battle of Two Kinds of Fates, 1st Edition, Hebei People's Publishing House in Shijiazhuang, 1990,  (set)
Literary and Historical Research Committee of the Anhui Committee of the Chinese People's Political Consultative Conference, Liberation War, 1st Edition, Anhui People's Publishing House in Hefei, 1987, 
Li, Zuomin, Heroic Division and Iron Horse: Records of the Liberation War, 1st Edition, Chinese Communist Party History Publishing House in Beijing, 2004, 
Wang, Xingsheng, and Zhang, Jingshan, Chinese Liberation War, 1st Edition, People's Liberation Army Literature and Art Publishing House in Beijing, 2001,  (set)
Huang, Youlan, History of the Chinese People's Liberation War, 1st Edition, Archives Publishing House in Beijing, 1992, 
Liu Wusheng, From Yan'an to Beijing: A Collection of Military Records and Research Publications of Important Campaigns in the Liberation War, 1st Edition, Central Literary Publishing House in Beijing, 1993, 
Tang, Yilu and Bi, Jianzhong, History of Chinese People's Liberation Army in Chinese Liberation War, 1st Edition, Military Scientific Publishing House in Beijing, 1993 – 1997,  (Volum 1), 7800219615 (Volum 2), 7800219631 (Volum 3), 7801370937 (Volum 4), and 7801370953 (Volum 5)

Conflicts in 1948
Battles of the Chinese Civil War
1948 in China
Military history of Shandong